The UAAP Season 80 volleyball tournaments started on September 9, 2017 with the junior tournaments. The games were played at the Filoil Flying V Centre, Mall of Asia Arena, Smart Araneta Coliseum and the Blue Eagle Gym. It is also sub-hosted by National University.

Men's tournament

Team line-up

Elimination round

Team standings

Match-up results

Game results

Playoffs / Finals

Fourth-seed playoff 
Elimination round results:
(Feb 18) UST def. Adamson 3–1 • 25–20, 25–21, 14–25, 25–22
(Apr 14) UST def. Adamson 3–1 • 25–23, 21–25, 25–16, 25–17

Semifinals 
NU vs UST NU with twice-to-beat advantage.
Elimination round results:
(Feb 25) NU def. UST  3–1 • 18–25, 25–21, 25–18, 25–18
(Mar 14) NU def. UST  3–0 • 25–21, 25–16, 25–22

FEU vs Ateneo FEU with twice-to-beat advantage.
Elimination round results:
(Feb 4) FEU def. Ateneo  3–0 • 25–18, 25–19, 25–22
(Mar 17) FEU def. Ateneo  3–2 • 25–27, 23–25, 20–25, 25–21, 16–14

Finals 
NU vs Ateneo
Elimination round results:
(Feb 7)  ADMU def. NU  3–1 • 26–24, 25–21, 17–25, 25–19
(Apr 15) NU def. ADMU  3–1 • 25–23, 21–25, 25–23, 25–19

Awards 

 Most Valuable Player (Season): 
 Most Valuable Player (Finals): 
 Rookie of the Year: 
 Best Scorer: 
 Best Attacker: 
 Best Blocker: 
 Best Server: 
 Best Digger: 
 Best Setter: 
 Best Receiver:

Coaching changes
UE Red Warriors: Coach Sammy Acaylar has resigned as Head Coach of the team, citing commitment issues with both UE and Perpetual Help, where he serves as the Men's Volleyball Head Coach and the school's Athletic Director. Coach Rod Roque took over as the interim head coach for both Men's and Women's teams.

Women's tournament

Team Line-up

Elimination round

Team standings

Match-up results

Game results

Playoffs

Semifinals 
La Salle vs NU La Salle with twice-to-beat advantage.
Elimination round results:
(Feb 18) NU def. La Salle 3–2 • 26–24, 19–25, 22–25, 25–17, 16–14
(Mar 10) La Salle def. NU 3–0 • 27–25, 27–25, 25–16

FEU vs Ateneo FEU with twice-to-beat advantage.
Elimination round results:
(Feb 4) FEU def. Ateneo 3–2 • 19–25, 25–21, 18–25, 25–20, 15–9
(Mar 7) Ateneo def. FEU 3–0 • 25–19, 25–21, 25–17

Finals 
La Salle vs FEU Best-of-three series.
Elimination round results:
(Feb 14) DLSU def. FEU3–2 • 25–22, 25–17, 24–26, 23–25, 15–7
(Mar 18) DLSU def. FEU3–2 • 25–17, 21–25, 16–25, 25–20, 15–5

Awards 

 Most Valuable Player (Season): 
 Most Valuable Player (Finals): 
 Rookie of the Year: 
 Best Scorer: 
 Best Attacker: 
 Best Blocker: 
 Best Server: 
 Best Digger: 
 Best Setter: 
 Best Receiver:

Players of the week

Coaching changes
UE Lady Warriors: Coach Francis Vicente has resigned as Head Coach of the team after five games into the season due to undisclosed reasons. Coach Rod Roque, UE's Athletic Director, served as the interim head coach for both Men's and Women's teams.

Boys' tournament

Elimination round

Team standings

Event host in boldface

Point system:
 3 points = win match in 3 or 4 sets
 2 points = win match in 5 sets
 1 point  = lose match in 5 sets
 0 point  = lose match in 3 or 4 sets

Match-up results

Scores

Playoffs

Finals

Awards

 Most Valuable Player (Season): 
 Most Valuable Player (Finals): 
 Rookie of the Year: 
 First Best Outside Spiker: 
 Second Best Outside Spiker: 
 First Best Middle Blocker: 
 Second Best Middle Blocker: 
 Best Opposite Spiker: 
 Best Setter: 
 Best Libero: 
 Best Server:

Girls tournament

Elimination round

Team standings 

Event host in boldface

Point system:
 3 points = win match in 3 or 4 sets
 2 points = win match in 5 sets
 1 point  = lose match in 5 sets
 0 point  = lose match in 3 or 4 sets

Match-up results

Game results

Playoffs

Finals

Awards 

 Most Valuable Player (Season): 
 Most Valuable Player (Finals): 
 Rookie of the Year: 
 First Best Outside Spiker: 
 Second Best Outside Spiker: 
 First Best Middle Blocker: 
 Second Best Middle Blocker: 
 Best Opposite Spiker: 
 Best Setter: 
 Best Libero: 
 Best Server:

Overall championship points

Seniors' division

Juniors' division 

In case of a tie, the team with the higher position in any tournament is ranked higher. If both are still tied, they are listed by alphabetical order.

How rankings are determined:
 Ranks 5th to 8th determined by elimination round standings.
 Loser of the #1 vs #4 semifinal match-up is ranked 4th
 Loser of the #2 vs #3 semifinal match-up is ranked 3rd
 Loser of the finals is ranked 2nd
 Champion is ranked 1st

See also 
NCAA Season 93 volleyball tournaments

References 

2018 in Philippine sport
UAAP Season 80
UAAP volleyball tournaments